Cissus repens is a species of tropical rainforest vine in the grape family. It is found in various parts of Asia including Malaysia. This vine is recorded as far south as Cape York Peninsula and the wet tropics region of north eastern Queensland, Australia.  It has heart shaped leaves, near them on the stem is the tendril. The specific epithet repens is from the Latin, meaning “creeping”.

References 

repens
Flora of Queensland
Flora of Asia
Flora of Malesia
Taxa named by Jean-Baptiste Lamarck